Linda Ellen Saltzman (September 8, 1949 – March 9, 2005) was an American public health researcher who worked at the Centers for Disease Control (CDC) from 1984 until her death in 2005. She was especially known for her research on domestic violence, which has been credited with helping to define the entire field. She has been described as "...one of the CDC’s top experts on violence, and one of the violence prevention movement’s most trusted allies." In 2007, the CDC established the Linda Saltzman New Investigator Award in her memory; it is awarded biennially to a new researcher in the field of domestic violence.

References

External links

1949 births
2005 deaths
American public health doctors
Women public health doctors
Domestic violence academics
People from Bloomington, Indiana
Brown University alumni
Florida State University alumni
Centers for Disease Control and Prevention people